Josef "Sepp" Plieseis (20 December 1913 -  21 October 1966) was an Austrian resistance fighter against the Nazi regime.  

Plieseis was born in Bad Ischl and became a young member of the Socialist movement.  He volunteered to fight in the Spanish Civil War, where he was wounded twice.  He was arrested in France and incarcerated in concentration camps in Gurs, St. Cyprienne, und Argiles before returning to his home in Salzkammergut.  He was arrested at the border by the Nazi authorities and sent to Linz, then Dachau, and finally to Dachau's annex in Hallein.  

He managed to escape from this camp and hid in the forests and mountains of his native area.  He helped organize resistance activities based on his experience that persisted until the Nazi surrender and American occupation in 1945.  After the war, he served in various political appointments in his home area and remained a member of the Communist Party of Austria.

External links 
 Austrian profile of Plieseis

1913 births
1966 deaths
Austrian resistance members
Communist Party of Austria politicians
People from Bad Ischl
Austrian communists
Austrian people of the Spanish Civil War
Dachau concentration camp survivors